Graciela Dixon is a former Chief Justice of the Corte Suprema de Justicia de Panamá (Supreme Court of Panama). She is widely considered to be the first woman of African descent to hold that position.

Supreme Court magistrates in Panama serve fixed 10-year terms and elect, from among their peers, the Chief Justice, who serves for one two-year term. She was nominated by Panama, under the Rome Statute, to sit in the International Criminal Court in the Hague, however, this nomination was not successful.

Prior to becoming a Supreme Court justice, Dixon spent 22 years in private legal practice. She is a graduate of the University of Panama and the Universidad Católica Santa María La Antigua.

References

External links
Supreme Court of Panama official Web site  (In Spanish)

Panamanian judges
Living people
Year of birth missing (living people)
Panamanian women judges